Arif Satria (born 17 September 1995) is an Indonesian professional footballer who plays as a centre-back for Liga 1 club RANS Nusantara and the Indonesia national team.

Club career

Persela Lamongan
After years of playing in lower leagues, Satria in 2018 signed a contract with Liga 1 club Persela Lamongan. He made his first-team debut for Persela after starting the 2018 Liga 1 match against Persipura Jayapura on 24 March 2018, in which Persela lost 2–1. He quickly rose as the team's starting center back, appearing in 56 matches in two seasons.

Persebaya Surabaya
Satria in 2020 signed for Persebaya Surabaya to play in the 2020 Liga 1 season and made his debut on 29 February 2020 as a starter in a match against Persik Kediri. Despite the 2020 season being canceled after three matches due to the COVID-19 pandemic, Satria's performance at Persebaya caught the attention of Indonesian national football team coach Shin Tae-yong who invited him to join several training sessions.

RANS Nusantara
Satria was signed for RANS Nusantara to play in Liga 1 in the 2022–23 season. He made his league debut on 6 December 2022 in a match against Persis Solo at the Maguwoharjo Stadium, Sleman.

International career
Satria, who has no experience playing in junior national teams, received a call to join the Indonesia senior team in May 2021. He made his debut with Indonesia on 4 June 2021 in a 2022 FIFA World Cup qualification against Thailand.

Career statistics

Club

International

Honours

Club
Persebaya Surabaya
 East Java Governor Cup: 2020

References

External links
 Arif Satria at Soccerway
 

1995 births
Living people
Indonesian footballers
Association football defenders
Liga 1 (Indonesia) players
Semen Padang F.C. players
PSP Padang players
Persebaya Surabaya players
Persela Lamongan players
RANS Nusantara F.C. players
Sportspeople from South Sumatra
Indonesia international footballers
21st-century Indonesian people